Brushy Mountain or Brushy Mountains may refer to:

 The source area of Hayfork Creek, Shasta County, California
 Brushy Mountain (Cobb County, Georgia), in the Atlanta metropolitan area
 The highest hill in Leverett, Massachusetts
 The highest peak in the Sierra Aguilada, Catron County, New Mexico
 Brushy Mountains (North Carolina)
 Brushy Mountain State Penitentiary, a former prison in Morgan County, Tennessee
 A mountain and trail in Tennessee; see Trillium Gap Trail
 Brushy Mountain (conservation area), a conservation area and mountain in Virginia

See also
 Brushy Peak Regional Preserve, Alameda County, California
 Brushy Peak
 Brush Mountain, a list of mountains